"Victory Lap" is a song by American rapper Nipsey Hussle and the title track of his debut studio album, released on February 16, 2018. The song features American singer Stacy Barthe and was produced by Mike & Keys, Sap and Amaire Johnson.

Background and composition
The song was originally titled "Mean Streets", in reference to the 1973 film. The chorus, sung by Stacy Barthe, interpolates the song "Knee Socks" by the Arctic Monkeys, which appears in Mean Streets. The song features "bombastic production" and a "downshifting keyboard labyrinth". Nipsey Hussle raps about his gifts and a "rags to riches" story of surviving in his neighborhood of Crenshaw, Los Angeles.

Music video
The official music video was directed by Sergio and released on December 31, 2018. Filmed in Tulum, Mexico, the video references lyrics from the first verse: "Flew to Cancun, smokin' Cubans on the boat / Then docked at Tulum just to smoke, look / Listening to music at the Mayan Ruins / True devotion on the bluest ocean, cruisin'". It sees Nipsey on vacation in Mexico, where he climbs an ancient Mayan pyramid and cruises on a boat. The video interchanges scenes from his trip with shots of Hussle in his Crenshaw neighborhood. His store, The Marathon Clothing, appears as well.

Charts

Certifications

References

2018 songs
Nipsey Hussle songs
Song recordings produced by Sap (producer)
Songs written by Stacy Barthe
Songs written by Alex Turner (musician)
Atlantic Records singles
Songs written by Nipsey Hussle